Eduard Konstantinovich Zankovets (born September 27, 1969) is a Belarusian former ice hockey player. He is currently the head coach of the Belarus men's national ice hockey team.

Zankovets competed as a player with the Belarusian team at both 1998 and 2002 Winter Olympics.

Awards and honors

Career statistics

Regular season and playoffs

International

References

External links

1969 births
Avangard Omsk players
Belarusian expatriate sportspeople in the United States
Belarusian ice hockey coaches
Belarusian ice hockey right wingers
Chicago Blackhawks scouts
HC Dinamo Minsk players
HIFK (ice hockey) players
Ice hockey players at the 1998 Winter Olympics
Ice hockey players at the 2002 Winter Olympics
Kazakhstan men's national ice hockey team coaches
Living people
Olympic ice hockey players of Belarus
Rockford IceHogs (UHL) players
SaiPa players
Soviet ice hockey right wingers
Ice hockey people from Minsk
Belarusian expatriate sportspeople in Russia
Belarusian expatriate sportspeople in Denmark
Belarusian expatriate sportspeople in Germany
Belarusian expatriate sportspeople in Finland
Belarusian expatriate ice hockey people
Expatriate ice hockey players in Russia
Expatriate ice hockey players in Denmark
Expatriate ice hockey players in Germany
Expatriate ice hockey players in Finland
Expatriate ice hockey players in the United States
Belarus men's national ice hockey team coaches
Belarusian expatriate sportspeople in Kazakhstan